is a Japanese slalom canoer who competed from the late 1990s to the early 2010s. He finished in 23rd place in the K-1 event at the 2000 Summer Olympics in Sydney after being eliminated in the qualifying round.

External links
Sports-Reference.com profile

1977 births
Canoeists at the 2000 Summer Olympics
Japanese male canoeists
Living people
Olympic canoeists of Japan